"The Cruel Day" was an American television play broadcast on February 24, 1960, as part of the CBS television series, Playhouse 90.  It was the tenth episode of the fourth season of Playhouse 90 and the 127th episode overall.

Plot
A French Army captain arrives with his wife and son at an outpost in a small town in Algeria during the Algerian War. Upon his arrival, rebels stage bomb a house, resulting in the massacre of a local family. The French forces capture a rebel courier, a handsome and intelligent 15-year old boy. When a lieutenant recommends torturing the boy to elicit information on the rebels, the captain faces a crisis of conscience. He debates the dilemma with himself, the prisoner, the prisoner's father, a priest, his wife, and his fellow soldiers. Frustrated at the captain's indecision, the lieutenant fails to act and allows a sniper to shoot and kill the captain.

Production
Herbert Brodkin was the producer. Franklin Schaffner was the director, and Reginald Rose wrote the teleplay.

The cast included Van Heflin as the captain, Cliff Robertson as Lt. Carvet, Phyllis Thaxter as Nicole (the captain's wife), Raymond Massey as Father Ruquoi, Charles Bronson as Sgt. Meras, Peter Lorre as a cafe owner, Nehemiah Persoff as the Algerian father, and Thano Rama as Yazid Boussena (the prisoner).

The production was Lorre's first role after being away from television for a year due to a health incident that Lorre described as sun stroke.

Reviews
Harry Harris in The Philadelphia Inquirer described it as "a stunning drama that helped regain for 'Playhouse 90' much of its onetime luster." Harris also praised Schaffner's direction and Brodkin's overall production as "beyond reproach".

Larry Wolters of the Chicago Tribune called it "a sensitive, moving, and suspenseful drama."

Fred Danzig of the UPI praised the cast as excellent and opined that its treatment of profound questions made the play "one of unusual importance."

References

1960 American television episodes
Playhouse 90 (season 4) episodes
1960 television plays